Serbia competed at the 2008 Summer Olympics in Beijing, People's Republic of China. The country returned under the name Serbia after 96 years, previously competing under the names Yugoslavia (1920–1988), Independent Olympic Participants (1992), Yugoslavia (1996–2002) and Serbia and Montenegro (2004–2006).

The flag on the opening ceremony was held by shooter Jasna Šekarić, who has won five medals in her five previous Olympic appearances.

Medalists

Athletics

Key
Note–Ranks given for track events are within the athlete's heat only
Q = Qualified for the next round
q = Qualified for the next round as a fastest loser or, in field events, by position without achieving the qualifying target
NR = National record
N/A = Round not applicable for the event
Bye = Athlete not required to compete in round

Men
Track & road events

Field events

Women
Track & road events

Field events

Cycling

Road

Football

Men's tournament

Roster

Group play

Rowing

Men

Women

Qualification Legend: FA=Final A (medal); FB=Final B (non-medal); FC=Final C (non-medal); FD=Final D (non-medal); FE=Final E (non-medal); FF=Final F (non-medal); SA/B=Semifinals A/B; SC/D=Semifinals C/D; SE/F=Semifinals E/F; QF=Quarterfinals; R=Repechage

Shooting

Men

* North Korean shooter Kim Jong Su was tested positive for the banned substance propranolol, and thereby stripped off his two medals from the pistol events. Therefore, Mikec moved up a position in each of his events.

Women

Swimming

Men

Women

Table tennis

Tennis

Serbia was to be represented in tennis by the women's world number one and 2008 French Open champion Ana Ivanovic and world number two Jelena Janković, men's number three and 2008 Australian Open champion Novak Djokovic and 2008 Wimbledon Championships champion and world number four in doubles Nenad Zimonjić, along with Janko Tipsarević. Ana Ivanovic announced her withdrawal from the tournament before her scheduled first round match due to a thumb injury.

Volleyball

Indoor
Serbia qualified a team in both the men's and the women's tournaments. The teams had virtually identical results: both teams finished fourth in their group, both teams advanced to the quarterfinals – where both teams lost. Similarly the final ranking of both teams was tied for 5th place.

Men's tournament

Roster

Group play

All times are China Standard Time (UTC+8).

Quarterfinal

Women's tournament

Roster

Group play

All times are China Standard Time (UTC+8).

Quarterfinal

Water polo

Serbia participated in the men's tournament, where the team won the bronze medal.

Men's tournament

Roster

Group play

All times are China Standard Time (UTC+8).

Quarterfinal

Semifinal

Bronze medal game

Wrestling

Key:
  - Victory by Fall.
  - Decision by Points - the loser with technical points.
  - Decision by Points - the loser without technical points.

Men's Greco-Roman

See also
 Serbia at the 2008 Summer Paralympics

External links
 The list of competitors for Serbia at the 2008 Olympics at the National Olympic Committee website
 Serbia at the 2008 Olympics at the official website

References 

2008
Nations at the 2008 Summer Olympics
2008 in Serbian sport